The 2009–10 São Tomé and Principe Championship was the 25th season of the São Tomé and Principe Championship the top-level football championship of São Tomé and Principe. It began in May 2009 and finished in March 2010.  GD Sundy was the eleventh club to win the championship and brought the number of titles that Príncipe won by any club to five.

Cancellations

After the cancellation of the football (soccer) competitions in São Tomé in 2008, the national championship  was cancelled.  The 2009 season suffered problems on the finishing date, the championship final took place in March 2010

The island and national football (soccer) competitions were cancelled for the 2010 season, the previous cancellations occurred in 2005, 2006 and in 2008.  The next season occurred in 2011, a year after the cancellation.

Teams
18 teams participated in the São Tomé and Principe Championship, 12 teams from São Tomé Island and 6 teams  from Príncipe Island . At the end of season champion of São Tomé Island League and champion of Principe Island League play one match for champion of São Tomé and Principe.

São Tomé Island League
This section lists only ten of the twelve clubs that participated that season.  Vitória FC (Riboque) won the island title and competed in the national final.

Teams

Principe teams 2011
GD Sundy won the island title and competed in the national final

National final
The 2009-10 nationalfinal took place in March 2010.  GD Sundy of Príncipe defeated Vitória of São Tomé 3–1.  Sundy did not participated in the 2011 CAF Champions League the following year.

São Tomé and Príncipe Cup
In 2010, Sporting Clube do Príncipe, the winner of Príncipe faced 6 de Setembro, the winner of São Tomé and defeated the club 2–1 to win their only cup title.

References

Football competitions in São Tomé and Príncipe
Sao
Championship
Championship